In psychology a person who has a martyr complex, sometimes associated with the term "victim complex", desires the feeling of being a martyr for their own sake and seeks out suffering or persecution because it either feeds a physical need or a desire to avoid responsibility. In some cases, this results from the belief that the martyr has been singled out for persecution because of exceptional ability or integrity.  Other martyr complexes involve willful suffering in the name of love or duty. This has been observed in women, especially in poor families, as well as in codependent or abusive relationships. The desire for martyrdom is sometimes considered a form of masochism. Allan Berger, however, described it as one of several patterns of "pain/suffering seeking behavior", including asceticism and penance. Theologian Paul Johnson considers such beliefs a topic of concern for the mental health of clergy.

See also
 Complex (psychology)
 Messiah complex
 Persecution complex
 Galileo gambit
 Victim mentality

References

Popular psychology
Complex (psychology)